Galaxy is a school in Murgiya, Nepal. It was established in 2049 B.S.

Boarding schools in Nepal
Secondary schools in Nepal
Rupandehi District